Amal Khudhair (born 1 July 1950 in Basra) is an Iraqi singer who lives in Baghdad and is known by some fans as the “Century's Singer”.

Career 
Khudhair began singing in Basra, and then moved to Baghdad with her sister Salima in 1963 to start her career. In the late 1960s she worked as a broadcaster and in the 1970s as an actress.

Khudair has performed in Iraq, Qatar, Russia, Germany, Spain and the United States.

Discography
Khudair's songs include:

Mur Fargak
Ala Dhayyak ya Gomar
Cristal
Ahawel Ansa Hubbak
Aini w Ba'ad Ainak
Yal Alametnil Hawa
Menel-Shubbak  
Ya Alef Wasfa w ya Hayf
Fedwa Fedwa
Ta'al
Laysh Nasini
Aany Men Yes'al Alayya
Ya Yumma Thari Ehwai
Mali Shughol bes-Sug
Gulli ya-Helo
Alal-Mi'ad Ejaytak
Sallam Alayya
Chi Mali Wali
Raqi
Analli Rabbayt
Ya Sa'ad
Ya Bu la'yon es-Sood
Ma A'aruf Hachel Wajhayn
Wain Rayeh
Wen ya Galob
Wa'adetni 
Oyooni
Foog Elna Khel
Ghayatek
Men Ghayr Amal
Boya Smallah
Ana men Ashoof Ehwai
Ana Et'abet
Atawba Imnel Mahabba
Awen Wanti
Sallem Ba'yonak el Helwa
Ana ya Tayr
Ghaltana
Dhal Bali Alayk
Men Beda Aowal
Allah ya Aen Eshkuthor
Khallina Enshofak
Shellak Alayya ya Zaman
Sabah el Khayr
Galaw Helo Kulen-Nas Tehwak

Theater 
The Ghost
The Soil
Christ's Thorn
The Earth
Lamps

Awards 
1999 Century's Singer title in Alshabab TV referendum .
2004 Shield of the Doha Festival of Arabic Song.

Personal life
Amal was secretly married for a short time in mysterious circumstances, then separated from her husband, and still divorced.

References

External links
Amal Khudhair is last original singing
Amal Khudhair is the singing lady of Iraq

1950 births
Living people
People from Basra
20th-century Iraqi women singers
21st-century Iraqi women singers
20th-century Iraqi actresses